Tubyak-Tazlarovo (Töbäk-Taźlar) is a rural locality (a village) in Novokiyeshkinsky Selsoviet, Karmaskalinsky District, Bashkortostan, Russia. The population was 60 as of 2010. There is 1 street.

Geography 
Tubyak-Tazlarovo is located 25 km southeast of Karmaskaly (the district's administrative centre) by road. Tazlarovo is the nearest rural locality.

References 

Rural localities in Karmaskalinsky District